The 2005–06 season in Swedish bandy, starting August 2005 and ending July 2006:

Honours

Official titles

Competitions

Promotions, relegations and qualifications

Promotions

League transfers

Relegations

International qualifications

Domestic results

2005 Allsvenskan Norra

Played between 11 November 2005 – 20 December 2005.

2005 Allsvenskan Södra
Played between 13 November 2005 – 20 December 2005.

2006 Elitserien
Played between 6 January 2006 – 15 February 2006.

2006 Superallsvenskan
Played between 6 January 2006 – 15 February 2006.

2006 Allsvenskan qualification play-off

2006 Elitserien play-off
First round

Quarter-finals

Semi-finals

Final

2005 Svenska Cupen
Final

National team results

Seasons in Swedish bandy
Bandy
Bandy
2005 in bandy
2006 in bandy